The King's Head was a public house in Merton High Street. An inn existed on the site from the 16th century, and served as a post house in the 17th century. The modern building was constructed in 1933, and is Grade II listed. It closed as a pub in 2004, and later became offices for London General Buses.

History
An inn was known to stand on the area in the year 1594, but the present building was only from 1933.  It is, however, listed as a local Grade II building.

In 1684, the daily post service to Epsom was started. The King's Head became the Post House for Merton. Young & Bainbridge purchased the building in 1831 and when the character of Merton changed, seven years later with the arrival of the railway, it became a typical pub.  After being rebuilt 1933, was a larger pub, with five bars and many associated activities.

It finally closed as a pub in 2004, and stayed empty for three years.  The building was then bought by London General Buses, and the internal structure rebuilt as a headquarter office, keeping the listed exterior in its original appearance.

References

 Osborne, Helen - "Inn and Around London" - 

History of the London Borough of Merton
Former pubs in London
Pubs in the London Borough of Merton
Grade II listed buildings in the London Borough of Merton